Laetitiae sanctae is an encyclical on devotion to the rosary by Pope Leo XIII, known as the "Rosary Pope". It was issued on September 8, 1893 in Saint Peter's Basilica in Rome.

In Laetitiae sanctae, Leo XIII wrote that he was "convinced that the rosary, if devoutly used, is of benefit not only to the individual but society at large".

Leo sees three influences undermining the tranquility of society. First, the distaste for the simple and life; secondly, repugnance to suffering of any kind; thirdly, the forgetfulness of the future life. "[W]e have constantly besought citizens who were conspicuous by genius, industry, family, or fortune, to join together in common counsel and action to safeguard and to promote whatever would tend to the strength and well-being of the community."

"We deplore … the growing contempt of those homely duties and virtues which make up the beauty of humble life." He sees a disdain of the simple life leading to jealousy, the trampling of rights, "...and finally, the people, betrayed in their expectations, attack public order, and place themselves in conflict with those who are charged to maintain it." "People come to see happiness and comfort as things to which they are entitled, rather than things to work for." Pope Leo offers, in contrast, the House of Nazareth, contemplated in the Joyful Mysteries as "an all-perfect model of domestic society!"

"While one can and should try to address unnecessary hazards and seek to ease one another’s burdens, suffering, sorrows, accidents, and difficulties are all part of life." "An abhorrence of all that is inconvenient or hard to endure leads people to avoid doing what is right. Leo finds support for the virtues of patience and fortitude in a consideration of the Sorrowful Mysteries."

Leo noted that even the pagan world "recognized that this life was not a home but a dwelling-place, not our destination, but a stage in the journey. But men of our day, ...pursue the false goods of this world in such wise that the thought of their true Fatherland of enduring happiness is not only set aside, but, to their shame be it said, banished and entirely erased from their memory". He recommended contemplation of the Glorious Mysteries, from which one learns that death is not an annihilation which ends all things, but merely a migration and passage from life to life."

In Laetitiae Sanctae Leo enumerated the three causes of evils in his era:

"There are three influences which appear to Us to have the chief place in effecting this downgrade movement of society. These are -- first, the distaste for a simple and laborious life; secondly, repugnance to suffering of any kind; thirdly, the forgetfulness of the future life." 

The "repugnance to suffering" found sympathy in those who supported the utopian life popular in 1893 in which "they dream of a chimeric civilization in which all that is unpleasant shall be removed, and all that is pleasant shall be supplied."

See also
 List of encyclicals of Pope Leo XIII
Providentissimus Deus
 Rosary devotions and spirituality
 List of encyclicals of Pope Leo XIII on the Rosary

References

External links
 Vatican website: Laetitiae sanctae

1893 documents
1893 in Christianity
September 1893 events
Rosary
Encyclicals of Pope Leo XIII